Indira Anne Varma (born 27 September 1973) is a British actress and narrator. Her film debut and first major role was in Kama Sutra: A Tale of Love. She has gone on to appear in the television series The Canterbury Tales, Rome, Luther, Human Target, and Game of Thrones (playing Ellaria Sand).  In September 2016 she began starring in the ITV/Netflix series Paranoid as DS Nina Suresh.

Early life
Varma was raised in Bath, Somerset, the only child of an Indian father and a Swiss mother who was of part Genoese Italian descent. Her mother was a graphic designer and her father was an illustrator. She was a member of Musical Youth Theatre Company and graduated from the Royal Academy of Dramatic Art (RADA) in London, in 1995.

Career
Varma's first role after graduating from RADA was as a courtesan in Kama Sutra: A Tale of Love in 1996. She then went on to act in Jinnah in 1998, and Bride and Prejudice in 2004. 

Her first television appearance was in 1996 in Crucial Tales. A notable early television role was the young Roman wife Niobe in the 2005 first season of BBC/HBO's historical drama series Rome. Her character appeared briefly in the second season of the award-winning series when it aired on 14 January 2007.

In 2006, she played Suzie Costello in the first and eighth episodes, "Everything Changes" and "They Keep Killing Suzie", of BBC Three's science-fiction drama series Torchwood. She appeared as Dr Adrienne Holland in the CBS medical drama 3 lbs which premiered on 14 November 2006 and was cancelled on 30 November 2006 due to poor ratings. Varma guest starred in the fourth-season premiere of hit US detective drama Bones as Scotland Yard Inspector Cate Pritchard. She also played the role of Zoe Luther in the first series of the BBC drama Luther.

Varma played the role of Ilsa Pucci in the second season of the Fox series Human Target until the show was cancelled on 10 May 2011.

In 2014, Varma was cast as Ellaria Sand, the paramour of Oberyn Martell in season 4 of the HBO series Game of Thrones. She played the role through season 7.

She lent her voice to the Circle mage Vivienne, in the 2014 role-playing video game Dragon Age: Inquisition. Later on, she also gave her voice to Katherine Proudmoore in Battle for Azeroth, one of the most recent expansion in the MMO role-playing game World of Warcraft.

In 2016, she played the lead role of DC Nina Suresh in the eight-episode British television drama Paranoid, streamed worldwide on Netflix.

Varma portrays a reform-minded corrections official in the 2020 ABC legal drama For Life, and appears as the double agent Tala Durith in the Obi-Wan Kenobi series for Disney+, as well as Mission: Impossible – Dead Reckoning Part One.

In 2022, Varma began narrating the Witches series of audio books by Terry Pratchett.

Theatre
In 1997, Varma appeared in two Shakespeare plays: she portrayed Audrey in As You Like It at the Nottingham Playhouse, and later that year played Bianca in Othello at the National Theatre, London. In the summer of 2001, she played Gila in One for the Road, by Harold Pinter, at Lincoln Center for the Performing Arts in New York City.

In 2002, she played Sasha Lebedieff in Ivanov by Anton Chekhov at the National Theatre and Bunty Mainwaring in The Vortex by Noël Coward at the Donmar Theatre, London. In 2004, she played Sabina in The Skin of Our Teeth by Thornton Wilder at the Young Vic Theatre Theatre, London. In 2008, she played Nadia Baliye in The Vertical Hour by David Hare at the Royal Court Theatre London. In 2009, she played Olivia in Shakespeare's Twelfth Night with Donmar West End at Wyndham's Theatre, London. In 2012, she played Jessica in Terry Johnson's Hysteria at the Theatre Royal, Bath. In 2013 she played Miss Cutts in The Hothouse by Harold Pinter in the Trafalgar Transformed season at Trafalgar Studios.

In 2014, Varma played Tamora, Queen of the Goths, in Lucy Bailey's "gore-fest" production of Titus Andronicus at Shakespeare's Globe. In 2015, she appeared alongside Ralph Fiennes in George Bernard Shaw's Man and Superman at the National Theatre. In 2020, pre-lockdown, she starred in Chekhov's The Seagull as Irina alongside Game of Thrones co-star Emilia Clarke at the Playhouse Theatre. Her 2019 performance in Present Laughter at The Old Vic theatre earned Varma an Olivier Award for Best Actress in a Supporting Role.

Personal life
Varma met actor Colin Tierney in 1997 while performing together in Othello at the National Theatre. They subsequently married and currently live with their daughter in Hornsey, North London.

Filmography

Film

Television

Video games

References

External links
 
 

1973 births
Living people
Actresses from Somerset
People from Bath, Somerset
Alumni of RADA
British actresses of Indian descent
British Shakespearean actresses
English film actresses
English people of Indian descent
English people of Italian descent
English people of Swiss descent
English stage actresses
English television actresses
English video game actresses
English voice actresses
Method actors
Audiobook narrators
Laurence Olivier Award winners
Swiss film actresses
20th-century English actresses
20th-century Swiss actresses
21st-century English actresses
21st-century Swiss actresses